Quercus × crenata, commonly known as Spanish oak, is a tree in the family Fagaceae. It is a hybrid between the European trees Turkey oak (Quercus cerris) and cork oak (Quercus suber). This hybrid has in the past often been called Quercus × hispanica, a name that properly refers to presumed hybrids between Portuguese oak (Quercus faginea) and Quercus suber.

Distribution
Hybridisation occurs naturally in southwestern Europe where both parent species occur. The Lucombe oak cultivar (Q. × crenata 'Lucombeana') is frequently found in British collections. To be a true Lucombe oak, cultivars must be clones of the original hybrid arising in William Lucombe's Exeter nursery. "Lucombeana' has received the Royal Horticultural Society's Award of Garden Merit.

Cultivation
A number of named cultivars are grown in gardens, parks, arboreta and botanical gardens.

Cultivars
 Quercus × crenata 'Lucombeana' ("Lucombe oak"), originally raised by William Lucombe at his Exeter, UK nursery in 1762.
 Quercus × crenata 'Waasland' ("Waasland select oak"), leaves display an unusual slender, lobed shape.
 Quercus × crenata 'Wageningen' ("Wageningen oak")
 Quercus × crenata 'Fulhamensis' ("Fulham oak")

References

crenata
Trees of Europe
Trees of Mediterranean climate
Plants described in 1785
Plant nothospecies